The Minority Business Development Agency (MBDA) is an agency in the United States Department of Commerce that promotes growth and competitiveness of the United States' minority-owned businesses, including Hispanic and Latino American, Asian Pacific American, African American, and Native American businesses. The current Under Secretary is Don Cravins Jr.

MBDA's stated mission is to  promote the growth and competitiveness of minority-owned businesses by providing access to capital, access to contracts and access to market opportunities - both domestic and global. The main feature of the organization and its site is to provide business consulting services to minority business owners.

History
On March 5, 1969, President Richard Nixon issued Executive Order 11458, establishing the Office of Minority Business Enterprise.  On October 13, 1971, President Nixon issued Executive Order 11625, which clarified MBDA's authority and expanded the scope of its operations. In 1979, the agency was renamed the Minority Business Development Agency.

The agency was cut in President Trump's FY18 executive budget, but subsequently restored in the President's FY19 budget - the only Federal agency to be restored after its proposed elimination.

On November 15, 2021, President Joe Biden signed the Infrastructure Investment and Jobs Act, which established the Minority Business Development Agency as a permanent agency. Prior to this, the agency was operating solely under Executive Order 11458.

National Minority Enterprise Development Week

The Agency holds National Minority Enterprise Development Week in the month of October, observed in the United States to recognize and celebrate the achievements and contributions of the minority business enterprise community.

President Ronald Reagan first recognized National MED Week in 1983. The week is formally celebrated each year by the Minority Business Development Agency, a U.S. government agency housed within the U.S. Department of Commerce.

On October 20, 2017, President Donald Trump issued a proclamation which officially designated October 22 through October 28, 2017 as National Minority Enterprise Development Week.

On October 24, 2017, President Trump  recognized minority-owned businesses in the Oval Office during National MED Week, when he welcomed winners of the National MED Week Awards with Secretary of Commerce Wilbur Ross and MBDA Acting National Director Christopher A. Garcia.

See also
 Title 15 of the Code of Federal Regulations
 Small Business Administration
 U.S. Department of Commerce

References

Further reading
 The Minority Business Development Agency: An Overview of Its History and Programs (Jan 11, 2023) Congressional Research Service report.

External links
 
 Minority Business Development Agency in the Federal Register

Government agencies established in 1969
Establishments by United States executive order
Investment promotion agencies
United States Department of Commerce agencies
Presidency of Richard Nixon